U.S. Route 52 (US 52) runs east–west across the southern part of the state of Ohio along the Ohio River, passing through or very near the cities and towns of Cincinnati, Portsmouth, and Ironton. For its first  or so, the highway runs concurrently with Interstate 74 (I-74) and I-75 before it winds through downtown Cincinnati for several miles. The route is primarily two lanes between New Richmond and West Portsmouth, Ohio, where it becomes a four-lane partial access highway until it exits the state near Chesapeake.

Route description

Indiana state line to Downtown Cincinnati
Starting at the Indiana state line, US 52, along with I-74, travel due southeast. In Harrison, both routes first meet New Haven Road and then Dry Fork Road. From Blue Jay to Dent, I-275 runs concurrently with both routes. While the three routes are sharing the same freeway, they meet SR 128 in Miamitown. After I-275 branches due northeast, both US 52 and I-74 then meet Rybolt Road/Harrison Avenue and North Bend Road; all are partial cloverleaf interchanges. After entering Cincinnati, they then meet Montana Avenue at an incomplete diamond interchange and US 27 (Beekman Street)/Colerain Avenue. At this point, US 27 runs concurrently with US 52. Less than a mile after that, I-74 ends as they meet I-75 west of the Cincinnati State Technical and Community College.

US 52 and US 27 then briefly follow south along I-75 before exiting at Hopple Street. Then, they also briefly travel east along that street before intersecting US 127 (Central Parkway) at a one-quadrant interchange. At this point, both routes travel south along US 127, largely paralleling I-75. As they reach Downtown Cincinnati, they split as a two-way pair. As a two-way pair, they intersect US 22, US 42, US 50, SR 3, and SR 264.

Downtown Cincinnati to Portsmouth

At this point, most of the remainder of US 52 in Ohio is part of the Ohio River Scenic Byway.

US 52 and US 27 then turn eastward along Mehring Way. Both routes run along the north bank of the Ohio River, serving two stadiums (the Paul Brown Stadium and the Great American Ball Park). They also cross under the John A. Roebling Suspension Bridge. After that, US 27 turns west onto Pete Rose Way and then south on the Taylor–Southgate Bridge. US 52 proceeds eastward to continue running along the bank of the river. Then, up until the Cincinnati Municipal Airport Lunken Field, US 52 is sandwiched between US 50 up north and the river down south. After the airport, the route briefly runs concurrently again with I-275.

US 52 then intersects several state routes in different locations. Between Ripley and the William H. Harsha Bridge, US 62 and US 68 run along with US 52. In downtown Aberdeen, US 52 intersects SR 41 and then the Simon Kenton Memorial Bridge. On its way towards Portsmith, the route intersects a few more state routes. As it gets close to Portsmouth, it becomes a short freeway, meeting SR 239 and SR 852/SR 73. After crossing the Scioto River, it enters downtown Portsmouth, ending the freeway. After that, it intersects US 23.

Portsmouth to West Virginia state line
On its way towards the West Huntington Bridge, US 52 meets more state routes in different locations, including SR 823 in Sciotodale. Large portions along the way are limited–access roads. East of Burlington, US 52 then turns south towards the bridge, crossing the Ohio River and the West Virginia state line.

History
With the creation of the "Inter-County Highway" system, two routes were formed along present-day US 52: Inter-County Highways (later State Routes) 7 and 42. In 1923, SR 42 was relocated to Marion-Mount Gilead routing (the new route is now SR 95) as per the highway renumbering. As a result, SR 130 was designated along SR 42's 1912 route.

In 1926, US 52 was formed along with the creation of the U.S. Highway System. The new route roughly travels along its modern-day route. However, both state routes along the route were retained. As a result, the 1927 Ohio state highway renumbering had relocated SR 130 to its current routing and truncated SR 7.

Major intersections

References

External links

 Ohio
52
U.S. Route 52
Transportation in Hamilton County, Ohio
Transportation in Clermont County, Ohio
Transportation in Brown County, Ohio
Transportation in Adams County, Ohio
Transportation in Scioto County, Ohio
Transportation in Lawrence County, Ohio